Kavaratti  is the capital of the Union Territory of Lakshadweep in India. Kavaratti is a census town as well as the name of the atoll upon which the town stands.
It is well known for its pristine white sand beaches and calm lagoons, which makes it a popular tourist destination.

Details
The island is 3.5 miles (5.6 km) long and tapers to a point at one end from a maximum width at the other of 0.75 mile (1.2 km). There is a shallow lagoon on the western side of the island, and coconut palms grow on the northern side. Kavaratti town is noted for the carved wooden pillars and roofs of its mosques and the carved stones of its graveyards. The town has administrative buildings, a bank, numerous mosques, and an aquarium. Tourism is of growing importance to the economy.

Geography
It has an average elevation of 0 metres (0 feet).

The inhabited island of Agatti lies 54 km to the NW and Suheli Par 53 km to the SW.

Demographics
The 2011 population for Kavaratti was 11,210 based on the 2011 census of India. Males constitute 55% of the population and females 45%. Of the 1797 families on the island, 57 (about 3%) are below the poverty line.

The literacy was 88.6% for Kavaratti. This was an increase from 44.4% in 1971. The male literacy rate was 94.1%, while the female literacy was 81.66%. In Kavaratti, 12% of the population is under 6 years of age.

The most commonly spoken languages are Malayalam, Mahl and English.

Climate
Kavaratti has a tropical savanna climate (Köppen Aw). March to May is the hottest period of the year. Humidity range is 70 to 76 percent.

The monsoon rains usually start at the end of May and continue through early November.

Economy

Tourism is one of the primary industries on the island. The island has pristine white sand beaches, favored by tourists for sun bathing. The calm lagoons on Kavaratti island are ideal for water sports and swimming.

A number of hotels and resorts have been developed on Kavaratti in recent years. The waters around the coral atoll are rich in diverse marine life. The Kavaratti Aquarium has a rich collection of corals and a vast collection of tropical fish specimens.

The other major industries on the island are fisheries and agriculture. Coconut is the dominant crop on the island. With the ascent of tourism, the fishing industry has seen a major decline.

Transportation

Among the most popular means of travel to Kavaratti from the Indian mainland is via an overnight voyage by passenger ships. A number of passenger liners operate from Kochi to Kavaratti and other Lakshadweep islands.

Commercial flights usually operate from Kochi to Agatti.

The closest international airport are the Cochin International Airport in Kochi and the Calicut International Airport at Kozhikode on the mainland.

Water supply
Ground water is the major source of water supply to Kavaratti. The island has 190 ponds to collect monsoon waters and 1325 wells.

With increasing population, the Government of India commissioned a low temperature desalination plant (LTTD) in Kavaratti in May 2005. The desalination plant established at a cost of 5 crores has a capacity to supply 100,000 litres of drinking water every day.

References

External links

 
Islands of Lakshadweep
Atolls of India
Cities and towns in Lakshadweep district
Indian union territory capitals
Islands of India
Populated places in India